Dominic Lewis Thompson (born 26 July 2000) is an English professional footballer who plays as a left-back for  club Blackpool. He is a graduate of the Arsenal academy and transferred to Brentford in 2019, for whom he played sparingly before transferring to Blackpool in 2022.

Club career

Arsenal
After beginning his career as a central midfielder, Thompson signed a two-year schoolboy contract with Arsenal in May 2012. He was developed as a left-back and progressed through the Hale End Academy to sign a professional contract in June 2018. During the 2018–19 season, he was an unused substitute with the EFL Trophy squad on four occasions and was a travelling reserve for the first team's dead rubber Europa League group stage match versus FC Vorskla Poltava in November 2018. Thompson failed to win a call into a first team squad before his departure in August 2019.

Brentford
On 7 August 2019, Thompson joined Championship club Brentford on a three-year contract, with the option of a further year, for an undisclosed fee. Behind ever-present Rico Henry in the left-back pecking order, he made five appearances during the 2019–20 season. Thompson again served as backup to Rico Henry during the first half of the 2020–21 season and made 9 appearances before departing on loan for the remainder of the campaign on 4 January 2021.

On 4 January 2021, Thompson joined League One club Swindon Town on loan until the end of the 2020–21 season. Five days later, he made his debut with a start in a league match versus Ipswich Town and assisted each of Swindon's goals in the 3–2 win. He made 25 appearances during the remainder of a season which culminated in relegation to League Two. After returning from the loan at the end of the regular season, Thompson was ineligible to play during Brentford's successful play-off campaign.

Despite appearing in all but one of Brentford's 2021–22 pre-season matches, Thompson was confined to making EFL Cup appearances during the early months of the regular season. He was a regular inclusion on the substitutes' bench for Premier League matches and due to a hamstring problem suffered by Rico Henry, Thompson made three starting appearances at left wing back around the turn of the year. On 27 January 2022, the one-year extension on Thompson's contract was triggered and he joined League One club Ipswich Town on loan until the end of the season. He ended his spell at Portman Road with 17 appearances. Ahead of the 2022–23 season, Thompson was not called into Brentford's pre-season training camp in Germany and transferred out of the club on 25 July 2022. Thompson made 19 appearances during three seasons with Brentford.

Blackpool 
On 25 July 2022, Thompson transferred to Championship club Blackpool and signed a three-year contract, with a one-year option, for an undisclosed fee. Four days later, he made his debut for the club with a start in a 1–0 victory over Reading at Bloomfield Road.

Personal life
Thompson is the son of Neville Thompson and his older brother is Greg Thompson, both of whom have competed in discus. He is an Arsenal supporter.

Career statistics

References

External links

Profile at the Blackpool F.C. website
Profile at the Arsenal F.C. website

2000 births
Living people
Footballers from Willesden
English footballers
Association football defenders
Arsenal F.C. players
Brentford F.C. players
Swindon Town F.C. players
English Football League players
Black British sportsmen
Premier League players
Ipswich Town F.C. players
Blackpool F.C. players